Thomas & Friends is a children's television series about the engines and other characters working on the railways of the Island of Sodor, and is based on The Railway Series books written by the Reverend W. Awdry.

This article lists and details episodes from the sixteenth series of the show, which was first broadcast in 2012. This series was narrated by Michael Angelis for the United Kingdom audiences, while Michael Brandon narrated the episodes for the United States audiences. This was their last series; starting from series 17, Mark Moraghan took over as narrator. 

Additionally, this was Sharon Miller's last series as head writer, and it was also the last series to feature episodes written by Miller (although she continued to work as voice director). 

This was also the last series to be produced by Nitrogen Studios.

Episodes

Voice cast 
Steven Kynman (Peter Sam) joined the voice cast. 

Togo Igawa did not feature (due to working on other television work), resulting in Hiro having a non-speaking role of appearance throughout this series of episodes. Michael Angelis and Michael Brandon left the voice cast after this series. (This is also Michael Angelis' final narration before his death on May 2020.)

William Hope takes over the voice of Bert from Kerry Shale, Ben Small takes over the role of Charlie in the UK and Matt Wilkinson takes over the role of Butch the UK from Rupert Degas.

Notes

References

2012 British television seasons
Thomas & Friends seasons